This was the first edition of the event.

Sofia Kenin won the title, defeating Anna-Lena Friedsam in the final, 6–2, 4–6, 6–4. Kenin won the title after saving a match point Jaqueline Cristian had against her in the second round.

Seeds

Draw

Finals

Top half

Bottom half

Qualifying

Seeds

Qualifiers

Lucky loser
  Lesley Pattinama Kerkhove

Qualifying draw

First qualifier

Second qualifier

Third qualifier

Fourth qualifier

Fifth qualifier

Sixth qualifier

References

External links
Main draw
Qualifying draw

2020 1
Lyon Open (WTA) - 1